Salud is a corregimiento in Chagres District, Colón Province, Panama with a population of 2,162 as of 2010. Its population as of 1990 was 2,085; its population as of 2000 was 1,895.

References

Corregimientos of Colón Province